Michael John Duffy  (born 2 March 1938) is a former Australian politician who served as an Australian Labor Party member of the Australian House of Representatives for the Division of Holt from 1980 to 1996. He was Minister for Communications from 1983 to 1987, Minister for Trade Negotiations from 1987 to 1990 and the Attorney-General from 1990 to 1993.

On 6 February 1990, in recognition of work on the Closer Economic Relations agreement between Australia and New Zealand Duffy was the first Australian and fifteenth appointee to The Order of New Zealand. In 1990 he was also awarded the New Zealand 1990 Commemoration Medal.

He retired from politics prior to the 1996 election which was held on his 58th birthday.

Duffy is currently the chairman of the board of directors for Racing Victoria Limited.

References

1938 births
Living people
Australian Labor Party members of the Parliament of Australia
Members of the Australian House of Representatives
Members of the Australian House of Representatives for Holt
Members of the Order of New Zealand
Attorneys-General of Australia
Members of the Cabinet of Australia
20th-century Australian politicians
Government ministers of Australia